Josef Hrach (born 7 May 1929) is a Czech former sports shooter. He competed in the trap event at the 1960 Summer Olympics.

References

External links
 

1929 births
Possibly living people
Czech male sport shooters
Olympic shooters of Czechoslovakia
Shooters at the 1960 Summer Olympics
People from Libušín
Sportspeople from the Central Bohemian Region